Backroads is a 1997 road movie directed by Emilio Martínez-Lázaro and written by Ignacio Martínez de Pisón, adapting the latter's novel Carreteras secundarias. It stars Antonio Resines, Fernando Ramallo, Maribel Verdú and Miriam Díaz Aroca.

Plot 
Set in 1974, during the last rales of the Francoist dictatorship, the plot follows the journey of salesman Lozano and his son Felipe driving a Citroën DS along the Spanish coast.

Cast

Production 
Penned by Ignacio Martínez de Pisón, the screenplay is an adaptation of Martínez de Pisón's 1996 novel Carreteras secundarias. The films is a Olmo Films, Sogecine, Kaplan and Fernando Trueba PC production, and it had the participation of Sogepaq and Canal+.

Release 
The film screened out of competition at the 42nd Valladolid International Film Festival (Seminci) in 1997. Distributed by United International Pictures, the film was theatrically released in Spain on 28 November 1997.

Accolades 

|-
| rowspan = "center" rowspan = "2" | 1998 || rowspan = "2" | 12th Goya Awards || Best Adapted Screenplay || 	Ignacio Martínez de Pisón ||  || rowspan = "2" | 
|-
| Best New Actor || Fernando Ramallo || 
|}

See also 
 List of Spanish films of 1997

References 

Films set in 1974
Films set in Spain
Spanish drama road movies
1990s drama road movies
1990s Spanish-language films
Sogecine films
1990s Spanish films